Ladines (Llaíñes) is one of three parishes (administrative divisions) in Sobrescobio, a municipality within the province and autonomous community of Asturias, in northern Spain.  

Parishes in Sobrescobio